

Introduction

Fuzzy Logix develops high -performance analytics solutions for Big Data. 
Fuzzy Logix offers in-database and GPU-based analytics solutions built on comprehensive and growing libraries of over 600 mathematical, statistical, simulation, data mining, time series and financial models.

History

Fuzzy Logix was formed in 2007 by Partha Sen and Mike Upchurch who met while working at Bank of America and shared a goal of making analytics pervasive.  In 2008 Fuzzy Logix released DB Lytix, the first complete and commercially available library of in-database analytics.  FIN Lytix was released in 2010 and was the first comprehensive library of in-database financial models. In 2010, Aperity OEM’d Fuzzy Logix models to run in their analytics and CPG software SaaS solutions.  In 2011, Quest  (now Dell) released Toad for Data Analyst (Data Point) that included Fuzzy Logix's models running in MySQL.  The company was started in Charlotte, NC, USA, where their headquarters are located today.  Fuzzy Logix has offices in Richmond, VA, Cupertino, CA and in the UK and India and has reseller partners in Mexico, Sweden, Japan and China.

Software

Fuzzy Logix offers four software products DB Lytix and Fin Lytix are comprehensive libraries of in-database analytic models.  The libraries leverage the user defined function (UDF) capability available in database platforms.  The software is available on multiple database platforms.  Since data movement from the database is minimized and database platforms are growing increasingly powerful, in-database models run 5X to 100X faster than models that use multi-tiered analytics platforms.

DB Lytix

Fuzzy Logix released the first comprehensive library of in-database models, DB Lytix in 2008.  The library had been under development since 1998.  The library includes mathematical, statistical, data mining, simulation and classification models.

Fin Lytix

Fuzzy Logix released the first comprehensive financial library FIN Lytix, in 2010.  The library contains models for equity, fixed income, foreign exchange, interest rate and time series models that are used by the financial services industry for risk management, pricing and portfolio optimization.

Supported Database Platforms

Aster Data, Informix, Netezza, IBM PureData Systems, MySQL, ParAccel, SQL Server, Sybase IQ  and Teradata.

Industry Use
Fuzzy Logix solutions are effective in optimizing business process  performance  by utilizing mathematical modeling based risk management. Industries like Marketing, Healthcare, Insurance, Digital Media services, Financial Services (Investment and Retail Banking, Brokerage Houses, Stock Exchanges, Hedge Fund Management) are some examples. Same techniques and superior performance can  potentially be utilized much more broadly for solving complex problems in  other  industries  and organization (Government programs, Educational institutions, Research) when there is a need for running Analytics on Big Data using complex models. Solutions are derived from Predictive modeling of behavior in assessing risk and modeling an optimal system.

References

External links
Fuzzy Logix homepage
DB Lytix software 
FIN Lytix software 
Predictive Analytics Applications examples  
Fuzzy Logix wins The Cherry, Bekaert & Holland Emerging Company Award at Rich Tech
Fuzzy Logix Announces Tanay Rx 
Trident Marketing Increases revenue nearly 1,000 percent with predictive analytics
MicroStrategy to Unveil Innovations in Business Intelligence at Upcoming Global Conference in Amsterdam July 9-12
CSC Report Highlights Organizations and Technologies Leading the Big Data Revolution
Fuzzy Logix Unveils FIN Lytix™ – In-Database Analytics for Financial Services

Companies based in North Carolina
American companies established in 2007
Database companies